Joan Lyons (born 1937) is an American artist. Lyons was born in New York, New York. In 1971, Lyons founded the VSW Press at the Rochester-based Visual Studies Workshop. In 2007 the Rochester Contemporary Art Center held a retrospective of her work. Another retrospective was held in 2023 at the Memorial Art Gallery of the University of Rochester.
  
Her work is included in the collections of the Museum of Fine Arts, Houston, the Museum of Contemporary Photography Chicago, the Museum of Modern Art, the Minneapolis Institute of Art, and the National Gallery of Canada, and the National Museum of Women in the Arts

References

Living people
1937 births
20th-century American women artists
21st-century American women artists
Women book artists
Book artists